Triboloceras is the name given to an extinct nautiloid genus from the Lower Carboniferous (Mississippian), included in the nautilid family Trigonoceratidae characterized by an evolute shell bearing longitudinal ribs, with whorls in contact except in the early and very latest growth stages. Chambers are short, sutures tend for form ventral and in some cases dorsal and lateral lobes. The siphuncle is small, tubular, and subcentral. ( 1964)

Triboloceras is a junior synonym for the previously named Vestinautilus and is generally no longer used.

References
 ,B. 1964. Nautiloidea - Nautilida in Treatise on Invertebrate Paleontology, Part K; Geol Soc of Amer and Univ. of Kans. press.
 Miller, A.K. & Garner, H.F. 1953. Lower Mississippian Cephalopods of Michigan, Part II, Coiled Nautiloids. Contributions from the Museum of Paleontology, Univ. of Mich.
 Sepkoski, J.J. Jr. 2002. A compendium of fossil marine animal genera.  Bulletins of American Paleontology 363: 1–560. 

Nautiloids